The following lists events that happened during 1909 in South Africa.

Incumbents
 Governor of the Cape of Good Hope and High Commissioner for Southern Africa:Walter Hely-Hutchinson.
 Governor of the Colony of Natal: Matthew Nathan.
 Prime Minister of the Cape of Good Hope: Leander Starr Jameson.
 Prime Minister of the Colony of Natal: Frederick Robert Moor.
 Prime Minister of the Orange River Colony: Hamilton John Goold-Adams.
 Prime Minister of the Transvaal Colony: Louis Botha.

Events

February
 25 – Mahatma Gandhi is arrested at Volksrust for failure to produce a registration certificate and is sentenced to 3 months imprisonment.

June
 15 – Representatives from England, Australia and South Africa meet at Lord's Cricket Ground and form the Imperial Cricket Conference (ICC).
 Mahatma Gandhi embarks in Cape Town for Southampton, England.

November
 30 – Mahatma Gandhi and the Transvaal Indian Deputation arrive back in Cape Town.

December
 28 – The first manned heavier-than-air powered flight in South Africa is made by French aviator Albert Kimmerling by taking off from the Nahoon Racecourse at East London in a Voisin 1907 biplane.

Unknown date
 South Africa becomes the first non-European country to join FIFA.

Births
 19 March – Louis Hayward, South African-born actor. (d. 1985)
 5 August – Oscar Mpetha, anti-apartheid activist. (d. 1994)
 5 September – Yusuf Dadoo, doctor and politician. (d. 1983)
 5 December – Bobbie Heine Miller, South African tennis player. (d. 2016)

Deaths
 13 April – Sir Donald Currie GCMG, shipping magnate and donor of the Currie Cups for rugby and cricket. (b. 1825)

Railways

Railway lines opened
 4 February – Natal – Creighton to Riverside (Cape), .
 1 April – Natal – Vryheid East to Hlobane, .
 18 May – Cape Midland – Barkly Bridge to Alexandria, .

Locomotives
 Two new Cape gauge locomotive types enter service on the Natal Government Railways (NGR):
 The first five of thirty  tender locomotives, the world's first true Mountain type locomotive. In 1912 it will be designated Class B on the South African Railways (SAR).
 A single  Mallet articulated compound steam locomotive, the first Mallet type to enter service in South Africa. In 1912 it will be designated Class MA on the SAR.
 The NGR begins to modify some of its Class C  Reid Tenwheeler locomotives to a  wheel arrangement to make them suitable for yard work without the risk of derailing as a result of the long ten-coupled wheelbase. In 1912 these will be designated Class H2 on the SAR.

References

 
South Africa
Years in South Africa